John Stark Hill  (April 16, 1950 – October 21, 2018) was an American football center and offensive tackle for the New York Giants, the New Orleans Saints, and the San Francisco 49ers of the National Football League (NFL). He played college football at Lehigh University graduating with a degree in engineering. He was drafted in the sixth round of the 1972 NFL Draft by the New York Giants.

John Hill played most of his career (138 games in 10 seasons) with the Saints and currently sits at 20th on the club's All-Time Games Played list. He was named to the New Orleans Saints Hall of Fame in 1992, and has been named to the team's All-25th, All-40th, All-45th, All-50th Anniversary Teams.

After leaving football, he became a State Farm insurance agent in Raleigh, North Carolina. John Hill died of pancreatic cancer on October 21, 2018.

References

External links
 Lehigh Hall of Fame profile

1950 births
2018 deaths
Sportspeople from East Orange, New Jersey
American football offensive tackles
American football centers
Lehigh Mountain Hawks football players
New York Giants players
New Orleans Saints players
San Francisco 49ers players
Players of American football from New Jersey
Deaths from cancer in North Carolina
Deaths from pancreatic cancer